Falange Española Independiente (FEI) was a Spanish political party registered in 1977, originating from the Frente de Estudiantes Sindicalistas (FES), a student group of anti-Francoist falangists.

History

After the resignation of Sigfredo Hillers in the 1980s and change most of the members and cadres of the organization left to join FE-JONS, and the organization was almost considered extinct. But, due to the persistence of a few veterans of the FES, the party was able to survive. FEI gained notoriety again in 1999, when, after an internal crisis in FE-JONS, many members joined the party.

In 2000 FEI formed an electoral coalition with the group Falange 2000. In 2004 both Falange 2000 and FEI merged with FE-JONS.

See also

Falange Española
JONS
FE-JONS
FET-JONS

References

Bibliography
José Luis Rodríguez Jiménez. Reaccionarios y golpistas. La extrema derecha en España: del tardofranquismo a la consolidación de la democracia (1967-1982). Consejo Superior de Investigaciones Científicas, CSIC, 1994. .

Falangist parties
National syndicalism
Spanish nationalism
Far-right political parties in Spain
Fascist parties in Spain
1977 establishments in Spain
Political parties established in 1977
2004 disestablishments in Spain
Political parties disestablished in 2004